Tan Le  (Vietnamese: Lê Thị Thái Tần, born 20 May 1977), a Vietnamese-Australian telecommunications entrepreneur, is a co-founder of Emotiv. She was named the 1998 Young Australian of the Year. In 2019 Tan Le became a member of Rho Chi.

Early life and education
Born in South Vietnam, Le migrated to Australia as a refugee with her family in 1982.
Le began university studies at the age of 16 and went on to complete a bachelor's degree in law and commerce in 1998 at Monash University.

Career
As president of the Vietnamese Community of Footscray Association, she made a number of contributions to charities and newspapers throughout Melbourne.

Le is a co-founder of software company Emotiv which specialises in electroencephalography (EEG) headsets. Le has spoken of her desire to ensure the company's products are affordable enough for the consumer. She believes that by democratising the technology, there is a greater chance of innovation from individuals, research groups and companies.

In February 2020, Le published her first book, The NeuroGeneration: The new era of brain enhancement revolutionising the way we think, work and heal.

Recognition
In 1998, Le was named Young Australian of the Year and one of Australia's 30 Most Successful Women Under 30.

Le's story was featured in the 'Hope' section of the Eternity Exhibition of the National Museum of Australia.

References

External links 
 Tan Le

1977 births
Living people
Australian women in business
Vietnamese emigrants to Australia
Monash Law School alumni
Businesspeople from Melbourne
People from Footscray, Victoria
21st-century Australian businesspeople
People educated at Mac.Robertson Girls' High School
Vietnamese refugees
Refugees in Australia